Victoria Endicott Lincoln Lowe, who wrote under the name Victoria Lincoln, ( – ) was an American novelist, biographer, and true crime writer.  Her best known novel, February Hill (1934), was adapted for stage and screen.  She won the Edgar Award for best fact crime book for her A Private Disgrace: Lizzie Borden by Daylight.

Early life and education 
Her parents were Johnathan Trayer Lincoln and Louisa Sears (Cobb) Lincoln. Lincoln attended Radcliffe College, and then lived in different locations including St. Louis and Europe.

Career and life 

Lincoln married her first husband Isaac Watkins in 1927. They were divorced in 1933, after which she married the philosopher Victor Lowe.

Lincoln is known for her writing which included books, biographies, and short stories. In a 1951 interview with the New York Times Lincoln described finishing her first book at age four. At age 14 she wrote a novel that would get published in a shorter form in Harper's Magazine in 1950. In addition to publishing books, Lincoln also wrote in notebooks that she stored away in an alligator-skinned trunk.

In 1934 Lincoln published February Hill, a book that was first adapted for the stage and then made into the movie Primrose Path.

Lincoln grew up in Fall River, Massachusetts and in 1967 she wrote A Private Disgrace, a book about Lizzie Borden, who also grew up in Fall River. In the book Lincoln's position was that Borden was guilty of murdering her parents during an epileptic seizure. In 1968 Lincoln received an Edgar Award for Best Fact Crime from the Mystery Writers of America for her book A Private Disgrace.

Lincoln's final book was a biography of the Roman Catholic saint Teresa of Avila which took her twelve years to complete.

Later life, death and legacy 
Victoria Lincoln died on 13 June 1981 in Baltimore.

Selected publications

References

External links
Victoria Lincoln papers at Johns Hopkins University

1904 births
1981 deaths
20th-century American women writers
American women biographers
Radcliffe College alumni
Created via preloaddraft
American women novelists
American non-fiction crime writers
People from Fall River, Massachusetts
American women short story writers
20th-century American biographers
20th-century American novelists
Religious biographers
Writers from Baltimore